Bicaudal D cargo adaptor 2 is a protein that in humans is encoded by the BICD2 gene.

This gene is one of two human homologs of Drosophila bicaudal-D and a member of the Bicoid family. It has been implicated in dynein-mediated, minus end-directed motility along microtubules. It has also been reported to be a phosphorylation target of NIMA related kinase 8. Two alternative splice variants have been described.

Mutations in BICD2 are associated with spinal muscular atrophy with lower extremity predominance type 2A and type 2B.

References

External links

Further reading